Jesús Torbado (4 January 1943 – 22 August 2018) was a Spanish writer, journalist and traveler. He was born in León and studied journalism in Madrid. He won the 1965 Premio Alfaguara for his novel Las corrupciones. In 1976, he won the Premio Planeta for En el día de hoy, a book about the Spanish Civil War. In 1993, he won the Premio Ateneo de Sevilla for El peregrino.

Works
 1965: Las corrupciones
 1968: Historias de amor 
 1969: Tierra mal bautizada
 1969: Un viaje por Tierra de Campos
 1973: Moira estuvo aquí
 1976: En el día de hoy
 1977: Los topos, (co-written with Manu Leguineche)
 1988: El camino de la Plata
 1990: Yo, Pablo de Tarso
 1991: El inspector de vírgenes
 1993: Héroes apócrifos
 1993: El peregrino
 1998: El imperio de arena
 1998: Viajeros intrépidos
 1999: La ballena

References

1943 births
2018 deaths
Spanish male writers
People from León, Spain
Travel writers